
Gmina Garwolin is a rural gmina (administrative district) in Garwolin County, Masovian Voivodeship, in east-central Poland. Its seat is the town of Garwolin, although the town is not part of the territory of the gmina.

Villages
Gmina Garwolin contains the villages and settlements of Budy Uśniackie, Czyszkówek, Ewelin, Feliksin, Górki, Izdebnik, Jagodne, Krystyna, Lucin, Miętne, Natalia, Niecieplin, Nowy Puznów, Rębków, Rębków-Parcele, Ruda Talubska, Sławiny, Stara Huta, Stary Puznów, Stoczek, Sulbiny Górne, Taluba, Unin-Kolonia, Uśniaki, Wilkowyja, Władysławów, Wola Rębkowska, Wola Władysławowska and Zakącie.

Neighbouring gminas
Gmina Garwolin is bordered by the town of Garwolin and by the gminas of Borowie, Górzno, Łaskarzew, Osieck, Parysów, Pilawa, Sobienie-Jeziory and Wilga.

References
Polish official population figures 2006

Garwolin
Garwolin County